Nieświastów  is a village in the administrative district of Gmina Kazimierz Biskupi, within Konin County, Greater Poland Voivodeship, in west-central Poland.

In 2010 the village has a population of 577.

References

Villages in Konin County